Diego Fabián Torres (born 6 November 1990 in Buenos Aires) is an Argentine footballer who play for Novorizontino as a midfielder.

Career

References

External links
 
 
 

1990 births
Living people
Argentine footballers
Association football midfielders
Chacarita Juniors footballers
Estudiantes de Buenos Aires footballers
Chilean Primera División players
Deportes Iquique footballers
Campeonato Brasileiro Série A players
Campeonato Brasileiro Série B players
Associação Chapecoense de Futebol players
Clube de Regatas Brasil players
Grêmio Novorizontino players
Argentine expatriate footballers
Argentine expatriate sportspeople in Chile
Argentine expatriate sportspeople in Brazil
Expatriate footballers in Chile
Expatriate footballers in Brazil
Footballers from Buenos Aires